Mark Allen Redman (born January 5, 1974) is an American former professional baseball left-handed starting pitcher.

Early career
A 1992 graduate of Escondido High School in California, he played baseball and football before attending The Master's College in Santa Clarita, California for one year and then transferring to the University of Oklahoma.

In his sophomore year at Oklahoma, Redman set school records for strikeouts (136) and innings pitched (135.1) during the regular season and posted a 5-0 record in post-season play as he helped the Sooners win the 1994 College World Series title.

Redman named 1st Team All-Big Eight, Big Eight Newcomer of the Year, NCAA All-Regional team and was a member of the College World Series All-Tournament team in 1994. In addition, he was selected as a 1st Team All-American in both of his seasons at Oklahoma.

Professional career
Redman was selected by Detroit Tigers in 41st Round (1148th overall) of the 1992 Major League Baseball draft, but did not sign with the team. He would get drafted again in 1995 by the Minnesota Twins in the 1st Round (13th overall).

Minnesota Twins
He would make his debut with the team on July 24, . In 2000, he made 24 starts for the Twins, finishing with a 12-9 record. He would go on to finish in a 4-way tie for 6th place in AL Rookie of the Year voting, receiving a single vote. 
The following season he made 9 starts for them and was later traded to the Detroit Tigers, for which he only made 2 starts that season due to injury.

Detroit Tigers
In his lone full season with the Tigers, he made 30 starts for the first time and finished with an 8-15 record and a 4.21 ERA. In the offseason, Redman was traded to Florida for three prospects.

Florida Marlins
Redman was a member of the 2003 World Series champion Florida Marlins, having a career year. He contributed to 14 wins and a career best 3.59 ERA. He also set a career high in strikeouts with 151.

Oakland Athletics
After the 2003 World Series, the Marlins traded Redman to Oakland for a reliever. He finished his lone season with the team with an 11-12 record and a 4.71 ERA. He was later traded to the Pittsburgh Pirates following the 2004 season for Jason Kendall.

Pittsburgh Pirates
Redman endured his worst statistical season, finishing 5-15 for the last place Pirates. He had a 4.90 ERA in 30 starts. He was traded in the offseason to the Royals.

Kansas City Royals
Redman was chosen to play for the American League in the 2006 Major League Baseball All-Star Game as the lone representative of the Kansas City Royals. He was 5-4 with an ERA north of 5.00 at the All-Star break. He would finish the season with a team high 11 wins and a 5.71 ERA.

Atlanta Braves
On March 9, he signed a minor league deal with the Atlanta Braves. On March 26, 2007, the Braves purchased Redman's contract from Triple-A Richmond. In his debut season with the Atlanta Braves, Redman pitched in 3 of the 5 initial losses for the team. His ERA was recorded as 8.62 on April 21, 2007. He continued to struggle with his ERA increasing to 11.63.

On May 2, 2007, it was reported that he would be undergoing surgery for an ingrown toenail. The Braves released him on May 22, 2007.

Colorado Rockies
After being released by the Braves, he signed on to minor league deals with Texas and Toronto, who ultimately both released him. He would later join his fourth organization in 2007 when he signed a minor league contract with the Colorado Rockies on August 20. He was assigned to the Double-A Tulsa Drillers and made a start that same day. On August 25, he was promoted to their Triple-A affiliate, the Colorado Springs Sky Sox. On September 7, Mark Redman was promoted to the Rockies and made an emergency replacement after Elmer Dessens went down in the 2nd inning with a hamstring injury.

On December 13, 2007, he re-signed with the Rockies.

On April 26, 2008 at Dodger Stadium, Redman became the first MLB starter since 1900 to give up 10 or more runs in the first inning and still complete the inning, allowing 10 earned runs and managing to follow it with 5 scoreless innings before finishing for the day.

On July 18, Redman was designated for assignment. He was subsequently sent down to Triple-A Colorado Springs on July 22, 2008.

References

External links

1974 births
Living people
All-American college baseball players
American expatriate baseball players in Canada
American League All-Stars
Atlanta Braves players
Baseball players from San Diego
Colorado Rockies players
Colorado Springs Sky Sox players
Detroit Tigers players
Edmonton Trappers players
Florida Marlins players
Fort Myers Miracle players
Hardware City Rock Cats players
Kansas City Royals players
Major League Baseball pitchers
Minnesota Twins players
New Britain Rock Cats players
Oakland Athletics players
Oklahoma RedHawks players
Oklahoma Sooners baseball players
Pittsburgh Pirates players
Richmond Braves players
Salt Lake Buzz players
Baseball players from Atlanta
Syracuse Chiefs players
The Master's Mustangs baseball players
Toledo Mud Hens players
Tulsa Drillers players
Wichita Wranglers players
Anchorage Bucs players
Peninsula Oilers players